Notre-Dame-du-Lac is a Roman Catholic church in the town of Le Thor in Provence, France. It was built in the 12th-century in the Romanesque architectural tradition.

Notre-Dame-du-Lac is listed as a monument historique since 1840.

References

Churches in Vaucluse
Roman Catholic churches in France